Lark is a ghost town located  west of Herriman in the Oquirrh Mountains of southwest Salt Lake County, Utah, United States. Lark was the location of several copper mines.

History
The discovery of gold in Bingham Canyon in 1863 brought a rush of prospectors, two of whom were named Dalton and Lark. Settlements with these names grew up around the two mining claims, but Dalton was later merged into Lark. The town of Lark was officially established January 3, 1866.

The town had enough Latter-day Saint residents by 1918 to be made a ward, but by 1923, the ward was reduced to a branch. It had 234 members in 1930.

By 1929, Lark was a company town of the United States Smelting and Refining Company, which expanded the town through the 1940s and 1950s. At its peak, the population exceeded 800. Then the nearby non-copper mines began to close, and the town went into decline. The last silver, zinc, and lead mine closed about 1971. In 1972, Kennecott Copper bought the land, and in 1977, they announced foreclosure. The company wanted the land to dump large quantities of overburden from nearby Bingham Canyon Mine. The population was 591, and Kennecott helped move people and some homes, even preparing a subdivision in nearby Copperton. By 1978, Lark was dismantled.

Lark's most famous citizen was Vina Fay Wray, more well known as Ann Darrow in the 1933 movie King Kong. As a child Wray lived in two locations in Salt Lake City, and also in Lark, before her family moved to Los Angeles.

See also

 List of ghost towns in Utah

References

External links

Company towns in Utah
Ghost towns in Utah
Mining communities in Utah
Populated places established in 1863
Ghost towns in Salt Lake County, Utah
1866 establishments in Utah Territory